The Three Communiqués or Three Joint Communiqués are a collection of three joint statements made by the governments of the United States (US) and the People's Republic of China (PRC). The communiqués played a crucial role in the establishment of relations between the US and the PRC and continue to be an essential element in dialogue between the two states, along with the Six Assurances and Taiwan Relations Act.

1st

The first communiqué (February 28, 1972), known as the Shanghai Communiqué, summarizes the landmark dialogue begun by President Richard Nixon and Premier Zhou Enlai during February 1972. Some of the issues addressed in this communiqué include the two sides' views on Vietnam, the Korean Peninsula, India and Pakistan and the Kashmir region, and perhaps most importantly, the Taiwan (Republic of China) issue (i.e., Taiwan's political status). Essentially, both sides agreed to respect each other's national sovereignty and territorial integrity. The United States formally acknowledged that "all Chinese on either side of the Taiwan Strait maintain there is but one China".

The use of the word "acknowledge" (rather than "accept") is often cited as an example of the United States' ambiguous position regarding the future of Taiwan.

2nd

The second communiqué (January 1, 1979), the Joint Communiqué on the Establishment of Diplomatic Relations, formally announces the commencement of normal relations between the United States and the People's Republic of China. In so doing, the United States recognized that the government of the People's Republic of China was the sole legal government of China, and acknowledged the PRC's position that Taiwan is part of China. In addition, the United States government declared that it would end formal political relations with the Republic of China ("Taiwan") while preserving economic and cultural ties. Both sides reaffirmed their wish to reduce the risk of international conflict as well as avoidance of hegemony of any nation in the Asia-Pacific region.

3rd

The third communiqué (August 17, 1982), also known as the August 17th communiqué, reaffirms the desire of both sides to further strengthen economic, cultural, educational, scientific, and technological ties. Both sides also reaffirmed the statements made about the Taiwan issue in the previous communiqué. Although no definitive conclusions were reached on the issue of arms sale to Taiwan, the United States declared its intent to continue selling arms to Taiwan and to gradually change its level of arms sales consistent with the PRC's militarization of the Taiwan strait.

A declassified cable sent on July 10, 1982, from Secretary of State Lawrence Eagleburger to AIT director James R. Lilley explained that reducing arms sales to Taiwan would be contingent on the commitment of the PRC to a peace across the Taiwan Strait.  Afterwards, the US clarified the third communique by issuing the Six Assurances to Taiwan.

See also 
China-United States relations
United States-Taiwan relations

References

External links 
 The full text of the Three Joint Communiqués

China–United States relations
1972 in China
1979 in China
1982 in China
1972 in American politics
1979 in American politics
1982 in American politics